Rosi Sailer (born 20 August 1931) is an Austrian alpine skier. She competed in the women's slalom at the 1952 Winter Olympics.

References

External links
 

1931 births
Living people
Austrian female alpine skiers
Olympic alpine skiers of Austria
Alpine skiers at the 1952 Winter Olympics
People from Kitzbühel
Sportspeople from Tyrol (state)